A bus chartered by Vietnamese pilgrims crashed in Texas on Friday 8 August 2008, killing at least 17 people and injuring dozens more, police said. The bus, carrying 55 people, drove off an overpass bridge of northbound U.S. 75 shortly after midnight and crashed near the town of Sherman, Texas, some 64 miles (103 kilometers) north of Dallas.

Sherman police said a blown tire on the bus may have caused the driver to lose control. Local media said that the group was from the Vietnamese Martyrs' Church, Our Lady of Lavang, and Our Lady of Lourdes of Houston, Texas. The bus was one of three buses carrying Vietnamese Catholics on their way to the annual Marian Days celebration in Carthage, Missouri in honor of the Virgin Mary. The bus tire was apparently recapped; the bus charter company had a history of safety violations, and the driver had a criminal record. The bus owner was identified as Iguala BusMex Inc.

Following the crash, the Federal Motor Carrier Safety Administration temporarily stopped issuing new bus company licenses.

The bus did not have seat belts. Some people have called for mandatory seat belts and safety glass in highway coaches.

See also
 Christianity in Houston
 History of Vietnamese Americans in Houston

References

External links
 "Motorcoach Run-Off-The-Bridge and Rollover." National Transportation Safety Board. NTSB report file
 Bus Crash North of Dallas Kills 12
 Illegal Tire Found in Bus Crash That Killed 15
 Deadly Texas Bus Crash
  Xe chở giáo dân đi hành hương Đại Hội Thánh Mẫu gặp tai nạn: ít nhất 15 người thiệt mạng
  14 người Việt hành hương thiệt mạng vì tai nạn xe buýt

Bus incidents in the United States
2008 road incidents
Transportation disasters in Texas
2008 disasters in the United States
Grayson County, Texas
2008 in Texas
Vietnamese-American history